Michelle Kettner (born  in Melbourne) is a former Australian weightlifter, competing in the 69 kg category and representing Australia at international competitions, having held Commonwealth, Oceania and Australian records. 

She participated at the 2000 Summer Olympics in the 69 kg event. 
She competed at six world championships (1993, 1994, 1995, 1997, 1998, 1999), most recent was the 1999 World Weightlifting Championships.
In 2000 she became the first Australian female to snatch 100 kg and set Australian records in both the snatch and clean and jerk in that year.

Major results

References

External links
 
 
 
 
 

1973 births
Living people
Australian female weightlifters
Weightlifters at the 2000 Summer Olympics
Olympic weightlifters of Australia
People from Melbourne
20th-century Australian women
21st-century Australian women